Threshold: The Blue Angels Experience is a 1975 American film featuring narration written by Frank Herbert and read by Leslie Nielsen. The film is about the Blue Angels, the United States Navy's flight demonstration squadron.

See also
List of American films of 1975

References

External links

1975 films
American documentary films
Documentary films about aviation
1970s English-language films
1970s American films